Tovik Church is a parish church of the Church of Norway in Tjeldsund Municipality in Troms og Finnmark county, Norway. It is located in the village of Tovik. It is the church for the Tovik parish which is part of the Trondenes prosti (deanery) in the Diocese of Nord-Hålogaland. The white, wooden church was built in a long church style in 1905 using plans drawn up by the architect N. Saxegaard. The church seats about 200 people.

See also
List of churches in Nord-Hålogaland

References

Tjeldsund
Churches in Troms
Wooden churches in Norway
20th-century Church of Norway church buildings
Churches completed in 1905
1905 establishments in Norway
Long churches in Norway